Michael Eckardt Thews (born 6 September 1964) is a German engineer and politician of the SPD who has been serving as a member of the Bundestag from the state of North Rhine-Westphalia since 2013.

Early life and education 
Born in Bremerhaven, Bremen, Thews studied at the Paderborn University.

Political career 
Thews first became a member of the Bundestag in the 2013 German federal election, representing the Hamm – Unna II district. 

In parliament, Thews has been a member of the Committee on the Environment, Nature Conservation and Nuclear Safety (since 2013) and the Budget Committee (since 2021). From 2018 to 2021, he served on the Parliamentary Advisory Board on Sustainable Development. In this capacity, he has been his parliamentary group’s spokesperson on sustainable development (2018–2021) and its rapporteur on the circular economy (since 2021). 

In addition to his committee assignments, Thews is part of the German-Israeli Parliamentary Friendship Group and the German-Canadian Parliamentary Friendship Group.

Other activities 
 Nuclear Waste Disposal Fund (KENFO), Alternate Member of the Board of Trustees (since 2022)
 IG BCE, Member

References

External links 

  
 Bundestag biography 

1964 births
Living people
Members of the Bundestag 2021–2025
Members of the Bundestag 2017–2021
Members of the Bundestag 2013–2017
Members of the Bundestag for North Rhine-Westphalia
Members of the Bundestag for the Social Democratic Party of Germany